Hieros gamos, hieros (ἱερός) meaning "holy" or "sacred" and gamos (γάμος) meaning marriage, or Hierogamy (Greek ,  "holy marriage"), is a sacred marriage that plays out between a god and a goddess, especially when enacted in a symbolic ritual where human participants represent the deities.

The notion of hieros gamos does not always presuppose literal sexual intercourse in ritual, but is also used in purely symbolic or mythological context, notably in alchemy and hence in Jungian psychology. Hieros gamos is described as the prototype of fertility rituals.

Ancient Near East

Sacred sexual intercourse is thought to have been common in the Ancient Near East as a form of "Sacred Marriage" or hieros gamos between the kings of a Sumerian city-state and the High Priestesses of Inanna, the Sumerian goddess of  love, fertility and warfare. Along the Tigris and Euphrates rivers there were many shrines and temples dedicated to Inanna. The temple of Eanna, meaning "house of heaven" in Uruk was the greatest of these. The temple housed Nadītu, priestesses of the goddess. The high priestess would choose for her bed a young man who represented the shepherd Dumuzid, consort of Inanna, in a hieros gamos celebrated during the annual Duku ceremony, just before Invisible Moon, with the autumn Equinox (Autumnal Zag-mu Festival).

Greek mythology
In Greek mythology, the classic instance is the wedding of Zeus and Hera celebrated at the Heraion of Samos, along with its architectural and cultural predecessors.  Some scholars would restrict the term to reenactments, but most accept its extension to real or simulated union in the promotion of fertility: such an ancient union of Demeter with Iasion, enacted in a thrice-ploughed furrow, a primitive aspect of a sexually-active Demeter reported by Hesiod, occurred in Crete, origin of much early Greek myth. In actual cultus, Walter Burkert found the Greek evidence "scanty and unclear": "To what extent such a sacred marriage was not just a way of viewing nature, but an act expressed or hinted at in ritual is difficult to say". The best-known ritual example surviving in classical Greece is the hieros gamos enacted at the Anthesteria by the wife of the Archon basileus, the "Archon King" in Athens, originally therefore the queen of Athens, with Dionysus, presumably represented by his priest or the basileus himself, in the Boukoleion in the Agora.

The brief fertilizing mystical union engenders Dionysus, and doubled unions, of a god and of a mortal man on one night, result, through telegony, in the semi-divine nature of Greek heroes such as Theseus and Heracles.

Tantric Buddhism
In Tantric Buddhism of Nepal, Bhutan, India and Tibet, yab-yum is a  ritual of the male deity in union with a female deity as his consort. The symbolism is associated with Anuttarayoga tantra where the male figure is usually linked to compassion and skillful means (upāya-kauśalya), and the female partner to 'insight' (prajñā). Yab-yum is generally understood to represent the primordial (or mystical) union of wisdom and compassion.

Maithuna is a Sanskrit term used in Tantra most often translated as sexual union in a ritual context. It is the most important of the five Panchamakara and constitutes the main part of the Grand Ritual of Tantra variously known as Panchamakara, Panchatattva, and Tattva Chakra.

The symbolism of union and  polarity is a central teaching in Tantric Buddhism, especially in Tibet. The union is realized by the practitioner as a mystical experience within one's own body.

Alchemy and Jungian psychology

The hieros gamos is one of the themes that Carl Jung dealt with in his book Symbols of Transformation.

Wicca

In Wicca, the Great Rite is a  ritual based on the Hieros Gamos.  It is generally enacted symbolically by a dagger (known as an athame) being placed point first into a chalice, the action symbolizing the  union of the male and female divine.  In British Traditional Wicca, the Great Rite is sometimes carried out in actuality by the High Priest and High Priestess.

See also
Maithuna
Spirit spouse
Sacred prostitution
Sex magic
Sovereignty goddess
Tantra
Fertility rites

References

External links

The Archetype of the Holy Wedding in Alchemy and in the Unconscious of Modern Man, Remo F. Roth, Ph.D.

Marriage and religion
Religious rituals
Religious sex rituals
Ancient Greek religion
Marriage, unions and partnerships in Greece
Inanna